Rosemary Neering (born 1945 in Croydon, England) is a Canadian author and journalist, focusing on non-fiction books. At the age of two Neering moved to Canada with her parents.
She worked for a number of magazines including the British Columbia Magazine.
Her 1992 book Down The Road  won the Hubert Evans Non-Fiction Prize.

References

External links
 
 Portrait on abcbookworld.com

1945 births
Living people
Canadian non-fiction writers
Canadian women non-fiction writers
Canadian women journalists
English emigrants to Canada